In mathematics, particularly in the field of algebraic geometry, a Chow variety is an algebraic variety whose points correspond to effective algebraic cycles of fixed dimension and degree on a given projective space.

The Chow variety  may be constructed via a Chow embedding into a sufficiently large projective space. This is a direct generalization of the construction of a Grassmannian variety via the Plücker embedding, as Grassmannians are the  case of Chow varieties.

Chow varieties are distinct from Chow groups, which are the abelian group of all algebraic cycles on a variety (not necessarily projective space) up to rational equivalence. Both are named for Wei-Liang Chow(周煒良), a pioneer in the study of algebraic cycles.

Background on algebraic cycles

Degree is constant in families of subvarieties, except in certain degenerate limits. To see this, consider the following family parametrized by t.
.
Whenever ,  is a conic (an irreducible subvariety of degree 2), but  degenerates to the line  (which has degree 1). There are several approaches to reconciling this issue, but the simplest is to declare  to be a line of multiplicity 2 (and more generally to attach multiplicities to subvarieties) using the language of algebraic cycles.

A -dimensional algebraic cycle is a finite formal linear combination
.
An algebraic cycle is effective if each . The degree of an algebraic cycle is defined to be 
. 

More generally, the degree of an algebraic cycle is constant in families, and so it makes sense to consider the moduli problem of effective algebraic cycles of fixed dimension and degree.

Examples of Chow varieties

There are three special classes of Chow varieties with particularly simple constructions.

Degree 1: Subspaces

This gives an isomorphism to a Grassmannian variety:

The latter space has a distinguished system of homogeneous coordinates, given by the Plücker coordinates.

Dimension 0: Points

This gives an isomorphism to a symmetric power of :
.

Codimension 1: Divisors

Letting  denote the vector space of degree d polynomials in n-many variables, this gives an isomorphism to a projective space:
.
Note that the latter space has a distinguished system of homogeneous coordinates, which send a polynomial to the coefficient of a fixed monomial.

A non-trivial example

This Chow variety has two irreducible components.

This shows that, in contrast with the special cases above, Chow varieties need not be smooth or irreducible.

The Chow embedding

By the definition of the degree, most -dimensional projective subspaces of  intersect X in d-many points. By contrast, most -dimensional projective subspaces of  do not intersect at X at all. This can be sharpened as follows.

Lemma.

This construction can be extended to an algebraic cycle  by declaring that .

The Chow-van-der-Waerden Theorem. The map  which sends  is a closed embedding of varieties.

In particular, an effective algebraic cycle X is determined by its Chow form . 

Relation to the Hilbert scheme

A more sophisticated solution to the problem of 'correctly' counting the degree of a degenerate subvariety is to work with subschemes of  rather than subvarieties. Schemes can keep track of infinitesimal information that varieties and algebraic cycles cannot.

For example, if two points in a variety approach each other in an algebraic family, the limiting subvariety is a single point, the limiting algebraic cycle is a point with multiplicity 2, and the limiting subscheme is a 'fat point' which contains the tangent direction along which the two points collided.

The Hilbert scheme  is the fine moduli scheme of closed subschemes of dimension k-1 and degree d inside . Each closed subscheme determines an effective algebraic cycle, and the induced map
.
is called the cycle map or the Hilbert-Chow morphism. This map is generically an isomorphism over the points in  corresponding to irreducible subvarieties of degree d, but the fibers over non-simple algebraic cycles can be more interesting.

Chow quotient 
A Chow quotient parametrizes closures of generic orbits. It is constructed as a closed subvariety of a Chow variety.

Kapranov's theorem says that the moduli space  of stable genus-zero curves with n marked points is the Chow quotient of Grassmannian  by the standard maximal torus.

See also
Picard variety
GIT quotient

References

 

 Mikhail Kapranov, Chow quotients of Grassmannian, I.M. Gelfand Seminar Collection, 29–110, Adv. Soviet Math., 16, Part 2, Amer. Math. Soc., Providence, RI, 1993.

Algebraic geometry